Dieter Kemper (11 August 1937 – 11 October 2018) was a German cyclist who competed professionally between 1961 and 1980. During his career he won one UCI Motor-paced World Championships in 1975, seven European titles and 26 six-day road races. He finished three times in third place at world championships, in motor-paced racing and individual pursuit disciplines.

Before starting to train in cycling in 1957 he was a successful water polo player with SV Westphalia in Dortmund. In 1961 he started in the Tour de France but had to withdraw early due to a crash.
 
He had another bad crash on 5 December 1976 during a motor-paced race in Cologne, when he was hit hard in the head and spent nine days in a coma.

After retiring from cycling he moved to North Holland with his wife, who later died of brain tumor in 2008.

References

1937 births
2018 deaths
German male cyclists
Cyclists from Dortmund
Tour de Suisse stage winners
UCI Track Cycling World Champions (men)
German track cyclists
20th-century German people
21st-century German people